HMS Cromer was a s built for the Royal Navy during the Second World War.

Design and description
The Bangor class was designed as a small minesweeper that could be easily built in large numbers by civilian shipyards; as steam turbines were difficult to manufacture, the ships were designed to accept a wide variety of engines. The ship's complement consisted of 60 officers and ratings.

She was powered by two vertical triple-expansion steam engines (VTE), each driving one shaft, using steam provided by two Admiralty three-drum boilers.

The VTE-powered Bangors were armed with a  anti-aircraft gun and a single QF 2-pounder (4 cm) AA gun or a quadruple mount for the Vickers .50 machine gun. In some ships the 2-pounder was replaced a single or twin  20 mm Oerlikon AA gun, while most ships were fitted with four additional single Oerlikon mounts over the course of the war. For escort work, their minesweeping gear could be exchanged for around 40 depth charges.

Construction and career
She was named after the North Norfolk seaside town of the same name. The ship was mentioned in the first broadcast episode of "An American in England".  She was lost on 9 November 1942, mined and sunk in the Mediterranean Sea off Mersa Matruh, Egypt, in position . Her commanding officer, Robert Stephenson, went down with the ship.

References

Bibliography
 
 
 

 

Bangor-class minesweepers of the Royal Navy
Ships sunk by mines
Ships built on the River Clyde
1940 ships
Maritime incidents in November 1942
World War II shipwrecks in the Mediterranean Sea